János Kilián (19 December 1922 – 26 March 2016) was a Hungarian speed skater. He competed in three events at the 1948 Winter Olympics.

References

1922 births
2016 deaths
Hungarian male speed skaters
Olympic speed skaters of Hungary
Speed skaters at the 1948 Winter Olympics
Speed skaters from Budapest